Literary descriptions of cities (also known as urban descriptiones) form a literary genre that originated in Ancient Greek epideictic rhetoric. They can be prose or poetry. Many take the form of an urban eulogy (variously referred to as an encomium urbis, laudes urbium, encomium civis, laus civis, laudes civitatum; or in English: urban or city encomium, panegyric, laudation or praise poem) which praise their subject. Laments to a city's past glories are sometimes also included in the genre. Descriptiones often mix topographical information with abstract material on the spiritual and legal aspects of the town or city, and with social observations on its inhabitants. They generally give a more extended treatment of their urban subject than is found in an encyclopedia or general geographical work. Influential examples include Benedict's Mirabilia Urbis Romae of around 1143.

The Greek rhetorician Dionysius of Halicarnassus, in the first century AD, was the first to prescribe the form of a eulogy to a city in detail. Features he touches on include the city's location, size and beauty; the qualities of its river; its temples and secular buildings; its origin and founder, and the acts of its citizens. The Roman rhetorician Quintilian expounds on the form later in the first century, stressing praise of the city's founder and prominent citizens, as well as the city's site and location, fortifications and public works such as temples. The third-century rhetorician Menander expands on the guidelines further, including advice on how to turn a city's bad points into advantages. These works were probably not directly available to medieval writers, but the form is outlined in many later grammar primers, including those by Donatus and Priscian. Priscian's Praeexercitamina, a translation into Latin of a Greek work by Hermogenes, was a particular influence on medieval authors.

Surviving late Roman examples of descriptiones include Ausonius's Ordo Nobilium Urbium, a fourth-century Latin poem that briefly describes thirteen cities including Milan and Bordeaux. Rutilius Namatianus's De reditu suo is a longer poem dating from the early fifth century that includes a section praising Rome.

Numerous medieval examples have survived, mainly but not exclusively in Latin, the earliest dating from the eighth century. They adapt the classical form to Christian theology. The form was popularised by widely circulated guidebooks intended for pilgrims. Common topics include the city walls and gates, markets, churches and local saints; descriptiones were sometimes written as a preface to the biography of a saint. The earliest examples are in verse. The first known prose example was written in around the tenth century, and later medieval examples were more often written in prose. Milan and Rome are the most frequent subjects, and there are also examples describing many other Italian cities. Outside Italy, pre-1400 examples are known for Chester, Durham, London, York and perhaps Bath in England, Newborough in Wales, and Angers, Paris and Senlis in France.  The form spread to Germany in the first half of the 15th century, with Nuremberg being the most commonly described city.

J. K. Hyde, who surveyed the genre in 1966, considers the evolution of descriptiones written before 1400 to reflect "the growth of cities and the rising culture and self-confidence of the citizens", rather than any literary progression. Later medieval examples tend to be more detailed and less generic than early ones, and to place an increasing emphasis on secular over religious aspects. For example, Bonvesin della Riva's 1288 description of Milan, De Magnalibus Urbis Mediolani, contains a wealth of detailed facts and statistics about such matters as local crops. These trends were continued in Renaissance descriptiones, which flourished from the early years of the 15th century, especially after the popularisation of the printing press from the middle of that century.

Selected examples
The following chronological list presents urban descriptions and eulogies written before the end of the 14th century, based mainly on the reviews of Hyde and Margaret Schlauch, with a selection from the many examples written from 1400 to 1550.

See also
Guide book
Travel literature

References

Non-fiction literature
City guides
Literature lists
Late Antique literature
Medieval literature
16th-century literature